The 2014 Wexford Senior Hurling Championship was the 104th staging of the Wexford Senior Hurling Championship since its establishment by the Wexford County Board in 1896. The championship began on 9 May 2014 and ended on 26 October 2014.

Oulart–The Ballagh were the defending champions; however, they were defeated at the quarter-final stage. St Abban's Adamstown were relegated from the championship. Shelmaliers won the title following a 3-8 to 1-11 defeat of St Anne's Rathangan in a replay of the final.

Results

Relegation play-off

Quarter-finals

Semi-finals

Final

Championship statistics

Miscellaneous

 Shelmaliers qualified for the final for the first time in the history of the championship. They subsequently claimed their very first senior crown.

External links

 2014 Wexford Senior Hurling Championship

References

Wexford Senior Hurling Championship
Wexford Senior Hurling Championship